The University of Tübingen, officially the Eberhard Karl University of Tübingen, is a public research university located in the city of Tübingen, Baden-Württemberg, Germany.

The University of Tübingen is one of eleven German Excellence Universities. The University of Tübingen is especially known as a centre for the study of plant biology, medicine, law, archeology, ancient cultures, philosophy, theology, religious studies, humanities, as well as more recently as a center of excellence for artificial intelligence. The university's noted alumni and faculty include presidents, a pope, EU Commissioners, and judges of the Federal Constitutional Court. The university is associated with eleven Nobel laureates, especially in the fields of medicine and chemistry.

History

The University of Tübingen was founded in 1477 by Count Eberhard V (Eberhard im Bart, 1445–1496), later the first Duke of Württemberg, a civic and ecclesiastic reformer who established the school after becoming absorbed in the Renaissance revival of learning during his travels to Italy. Its first rector was Johannes Nauclerus.

Its present name was conferred on it in 1769 by Duke Karl Eugen who appended his first name to that of the founder. The university later became the principal university of the kingdom of Württemberg. Today, it is one of nine state universities funded by the German federal state of Baden-Württemberg.

The University of Tübingen has a history of innovative thought, particularly in theology, in which the university and the Tübinger Stift are famous to this day. Philipp Melanchthon (1497–1560), the prime mover in building the German school system and a chief figure in the Protestant Reformation, helped establish its direction. Among Tübingen's eminent students (and/or professors) have been the astronomer Johannes Kepler; the economist Horst Köhler (President of Germany); Joseph Ratzinger (Pope Benedict XVI), poet Friedrich Hölderlin, and the philosophers Friedrich Schelling and Georg Wilhelm Friedrich Hegel. "The Tübingen Three" refers to Hölderlin, Hegel and Schelling, who were roommates at the Tübinger Stift. Theologian Helmut Thielicke revived postwar Tübingen when he took over a professorship at the reopened theological faculty in 1947, being made administrative head of the university and President of the Chancellor's Conference in 1951. Philosopher and theologian Ernst Bloch is another prominent figure associated with Tübingen's postwar revival.

The university rose to the height of its prominence in the middle of the 19th century with the teachings of poet and civic leader Ludwig Uhland and the Protestant theologian Ferdinand Christian Baur, whose circle, colleagues and students became known as the "Tübingen School", which pioneered the historical-critical analysis of biblical and early Christian texts, an approach generally referred to as "higher criticism". The University of Tübingen also was the first German university to establish a faculty of natural sciences, in 1863. DNA was discovered in 1868 at the University of Tübingen by Friedrich Miescher. Christiane Nüsslein-Volhard, the first female Nobel Prize winner in medicine in Germany, also works at Tübingen. The faculty for economics and business was founded in 1817 as the "Staatswissenschaftliche Fakultät" and was the first of its kind in Germany.

Starting in the late 1990s at Tübingen, fundamental research on mRNA-based substances (e.g. for cancer treatment and vaccines) was conducted by groups led by H. G. Rammensee and G. Jung. This work contributed to the Ph.D. and later research of Ingmar Hoerr and by extension to the COVID-19 vaccine programs by BioNTech, Moderna and Curevac.

Nazi period

The university played a leading role in efforts to legitimize the policies of the Third Reich as "scientific". Even before the victory of the Nazi Party in the general election in March 1933, there were hardly any Jewish faculty and a few Jewish students. Physicist Hans Bethe was dismissed on 20 April 1933 because of "non-Aryan" origin. Religion professor Traugott Konstantin Oesterreich and the mathematician Erich Kamke were forced to take early retirement, probably in both cases the "non-Aryan" origin of their wives. At least 1158 people were sterilized at the University Hospital.

After the war
In 1966, Joseph Ratzinger, who would later become Pope Benedict XVI, was appointed to a chair in dogmatic theology in the Faculty of Catholic Theology at Tübingen, where he was a colleague of Hans Küng.In 1967, Jürgen Moltmann (b. 1926), one of the most influential Protestant theologians of the 20th century, was appointed Professor of Systematic Theology in the Faculty of Protestant Theology. Drafted in 1944 by Nazi Germany, he was an Allied prisoner of war 1945–1948. He was influenced by his colleague and friend Ernst Bloch, the Marxist philosopher.

In 1970, the university was restructured into a series of faculties as independent departments of study and research after the manner of French universities.

The university made the headlines in November 2009 when a group of left-leaning students occupied one of the main lecture halls, the Kupferbau, for several days. The students' goal was to protest tuition fees and maintain that education should be free for everyone.

In May 2010, Tübingen joined the Matariki Network of Universities (MNU) together with Dartmouth College (US), Durham University (UK), Queen's University (Canada), University of Otago (New Zealand), University of Western Australia (Australia) and Uppsala University (Sweden).

On 27 April 2022, for the first time, a woman was elected Rector in the person of Karla Pollmann.

Research focus

The University of Tübingen undertakes a broad range of research projects in various fields. Among the more prominent ones in the natural sciences are the Hertie Institute for Clinical Brain Research, which focuses on general, cognitive and cellular neurology as well as neurodegeneration, and the Centre for Interdisciplinary Clinical Research, which deals primarily with cell biology in diagnostics and therapy of organ system diseases. In the liberal arts, the University of Tübingen is noteworthy for having the only faculty of rhetoric in Germany – the department was founded by Walter Jens, an important intellectual and literary critic. The university also boasts continued pre-eminence in its centuries-old traditions of research in the fields of philosophy, theology and philology. Since at least the nineteenth century, Tübingen has been the home of world-class research in prehistoric studies and the study of antiquity, including the study of the ancient Near East; a particular focus of the research in these areas at the University of Tübingen has been Anatolia, e.g., through the continued excavations of the university at Troy. The University of Tübingen is also host to a number of Collaborative Research Centres, producing fundamental interdisciplinary research.

Campus

The University of Tübingen is not a campus university, but is spread throughout the town: Tübingen is one of five classical "university towns" in Germany. The other four are Marburg, Göttingen, Freiburg and Heidelberg. In Tübingen there are four areas with a major concentration of university institutions.
The university uses a number of buildings in the old town of Tübingen, some of which date back to the foundation of the university. Today, these are mainly used by smaller humanities departments, as is the adjacent medieval castle, Schloss Hohentübingen.
Northeast of the old town, the Wilhelmstraße area surrounding the street of the same name is home to larger humanities departments as well as the university's administration. The main university library and main refectory are also in this area.
 A new campus for the sciences was built in the 1970s at Morgenstelle, a hill north of the historic centre of Tübingen. Facilities include a large refectory.
 The university's teaching hospitals are located between the Wilhelmstraße area and the Morgenstelle campus in an area collectively known as the Klinikum. The 17 hospitals in Tübingen affiliated with the university's faculty of medicine have 1,500 patient beds, and cater to 66,000 in-patients and 200,000 out-patients on an annual basis.

Accommodation provided by the Tübingen Studentenwerk is in several locations throughout the town. The largest of the eleven halls of residence are in the city's northern neighbourhood of Waldhäuser Ost (1,700 rooms) and in the city's southeasternmost neighbourhood, Französisches Viertel (500 rooms).

Museum 

Since 2006, the young Museum of the University of Tübingen (MUT) has made it its task to professionalize the 65 sometimes very old, singular teaching, show and research collections of the university from all faculties in terms of collection, curatorial and organizational aspects. In interdisciplinary exhibitions, both the broader public should be provided with insights into the history of science as well as researched in the field of science itself.

In addition, the master's degree program "Museum & Collections" of the MUT, with the participation of six humanities and cultural studies subjects, offers the training of students in the field of exhibitions.

Eight scientific teaching collections – Origins of Art, Pile Dwellings + Celts, Cuneiform, Gods + Tombs, Ancient Art, Ancient Coins, Ancient Sculptures – are open to the public in the Museum Alte Kulturen and in the permanent exhibition WeltKulturen in Hohentübingen Castle. In addition, there are other, partially accessible scientific teaching collections on Hohentübingen: Cradle of Biochemistry (Schlosslabor), BildBestand, Everyday Culture, AntikenBilder, Professor Gallery (partial), Castle Church and TonSteineScherben.

The MUT – and thus the Eberhard Karls University of Tübingen – is the only university institution in the world to house artefacts with world heritage status, such as the oldest surviving figurative works of art and musical instruments of humanity, mammoth ivory figures and fragments of bone flutes. These come from the Vogelherdhöhle (Swabian Alb), which has been part of the UNESCO World Heritage "Caves and Ice Age Art in the Swabian Jura" since 2017.

Libraries

The University Library of Tübingen is not just available to those affiliated with the university, but also to the general public. The library provides more than three million individual volumes and more than 7,600 journals. Apart from the main library, more than 80 departmental libraries containing an additional three million volumes are also associated with the university.

The main lending library is located on Wilhelmstraße and consists of several different parts which are connected through corridors and walkways:
The Bonatzbau, the library's oldest building, was built in 1912 and currently houses the historical reading room (Historischer Lesesaal), the university archive, along with a number of manuscript collections.
The library's main building, constructed in 1963, contains the information desk and research stations to access electronic catalogues and databases.
The Ammerbau is the most recent addition to the library complex. Built in 2002, it offers users direct access to over 300,000 volumes and latest issues of newspapers, magazines and journals. It also contains numerous work places and separate individual rooms for group work.

Organisation

Faculties

The university is made up of seven faculties, some of which are subdivided into further departments.
Protestant Theology
Catholic Theology
Law
Medicine
Humanities
Economics and Social Sciences
Science

Governance
The university is governed by three separate bodies sharing different functions and duties. However, some persons serve in more than one body.

The Rectorate is the executive component of the university's governing body. The current rector, Professor Karla Pollmann, is supported by four deputies consisting of three prorectors and one provost. All are also permanent members of the university senate.

The Senate forms the legislative section of governance. Apart from the members of the rectorate, it includes the equal opportunities commissioner, the deans and 20 elected members representing the professors, lecturers, students and non-academic staff. Two advisors represent the university's teaching hospitals.

The University Council (Hochschulrat or Universitätsrat) has 13 members, including its president and vice-president as well as five further internal and six external members.

Rankings and reputation

Since 2012, the University of Tübingen has been regarded as one of eleven German Excellence Universities that have been successful in the competition of the German Universities Excellence Initiative. The award brings additional research funds for five years. With three successful research Clusters of Excellence approved by the German Universities Excellence Initiative in 2018, Tübingen is one of the three universities with the highest research output in Germany and leading among universities in South Germany.

According to the funding report of the German Research Foundation (DFG) 2018, which breaks down the grants awarded to German universities from 2014 to 2016, the University of Tübingen was ranked 8th overall, 4th in humanities and social sciences, and 6th in life sciences including medicine. This ranking is based on a selection of best research projects nationwide and thus regarded as an indicator of the quality of research.

In the Times Higher Education World University Ranking (2021), Tübingen was ranked 78th worldwide and 5th nationwide. US News Best Global Universities and QS World University Rankings also ranked Tübingen amongst the top ten universities in Germany overall in 2021.

Traditionally, Tübingen has been particularly strong in the fields of humanities, especially in theology and religious studies, medicine, and law:

 In 2019, Tübingen was ranked 6th worldwide and 1st nationwide in the fields of theology and religious studies by QS World University Rankings.
 In the Times Higher Education World University Ranking (2021), Tübingen was ranked 24th worldwide and 3rd nationwide in arts and humanities. According to the QS World University Ranking (2021), Tübingen ranks among the world's top universities in the subjects of archaeology (21st), classics and ancient history (35th), and anthropology (49th).
 According to the Times Higher Education World University Ranking (2021), Tübingen also ranks among the top universities worldwide in life sciences (61st), psychology (65th), and medicine (75th).
 The Tübingen Law School was ranked second nationwide by the Wirtschaftswoche University Ranking. Also according to international rankings, Tübingen regularly ranks among the top ten law schools in Germany.

The University of Tübingen is the only university in the German-speaking world that teaches rhetoric as an independent subject of study.

Controversies

Since 2018, the university has been part of a wider artificial intelligence research initiative named Cyber Valley. Cyber Valley has seen investments from multinational companies poured into establishing research centers, research groups, and professorships in the city. The investing organisations and corporations include Google, Amazon, BMW, IAV, Daimler, Porsche, and Bosch. The Cyber Valley initiative has attracted criticism from student groups and activist groups alike, with many protest actions, including building occupations and demonstrations, having taken place decrying both the commercialisation of university research and the involvement of the university with organisations that are engaged in military research.

Student life

The university's students make up roughly a third of the total population of Tübingen and the town's culture can seem to be largely dominated by them. As a result there is a slump of activity during university holidays, particularly over the summer when a large number of otherwise regular events are not happening.

Around 30 Studentenverbindungen, the German type of fraternities, are associated with the university. While famous for their parties, public academic lectures and the yearly "Stocherkahn-Rennen" punting-boat race on the Neckar river, some of them are the subject of ongoing controversy surrounding alleged rightwing policial views, leading to strong criticism from leftist groups. The university itself takes a neutral stance on this issue. However, all of Tübingen's fraternities distance themselves from the fraternities of the Deutsche Burschenschaft, which have been widely criticized as adhering to far-right principles.

Also closely linked to the university are a number of student societies representing mainly the arts and political parties. Most notable are a number of choirs as well as student theatre groups affiliated with the faculty of Modern Languages, some of which perform in foreign languages. Radio Uniwelle Tübingen is the university's radio station, airing seven hours of programmes a week produced by students under the supervision of staff employed by the university.

The university also offers gym and sports classes called Hochschulsport. Since Tübingen has a department of sports science with a broad range of facilities, students of other subjects have the possibility to participate in various kinds of sports courses in teams or as individuals. Furthermore, even exotic sports, such as parachuting or martial arts, are offered. Students may attend courses either for free or at reduced rates. The sports department is located close to the Wilhelmstraße area of university buildings and is served by a number of frequent bus routes.

Unlike in some major cities, student discounts are not widely available in Tübingen. Cinemas and the town council's public library in particular do not offer discounts for students, and there are only a handful of restaurants which have reduced lunch deals. However, students may benefit from the Semesterticket, a heavily discounted public transport season pass offering six months of unlimited travel on trains and buses in the naldo Verkehrsverbund transport association for approximately €62.50. The Landestheater Tübingen theatre and all public swimming pools also have discounts for students.

Nightlife in Tübingen is centered on the numerous pubs in the old town along with a number of clubs, most of which dedicate themselves to non-mainstream music. During the semester, the Studentenwerk-owned Clubhaus at the centre of the Wilhelmstraße university area hosts the weekly Clubhausfest on Thursday nights. This popular, free-entry club night is organized and promoted by student societies and Fachschaft student representative bodies and all proceeds go towards their activities in support of students.

Notable academic staff 

 Eberhard Jüngel (1934–2021), German Lutheran theologian
 Christiane Nüsslein-Volhard (born 1942), German developmental biologist and 1995 Nobel Prize-winner

Notable alumni 

The University of Tübingen has a long list of notable alumni and staff. As of 2022, eleven Nobel Laureates, 18 Leibniz Laureates and five Alexander von Humboldt Professorships are affiliated with the university.

Besides several Federal Ministers of Germany and Minister Presidents of German States, politicians associated with the University of Tübingen include six founding fathers of the Federal Republic of Germany, a Chancellor of Germany, two Presidents of Germany, and several European Commissioners.

As Tübingen has traditionally been home to one of the most prestigious law schools in Germany, alumni in the legal profession include at least 19 judges of the Federal Constitutional Court of Germany, the first female German judge at the European Court of Justice, an Advocate General at the European Court of Justice, as well as several judges at the Federal Court of Justice, the Federal Fiscal Court, and the Federal Labour Court. Notable legal scholars associated with Tübingen include Dieter Medicus, Klaus Hopt and Wolfgang Ernst.

Affiliates in the field of religious studies include many of the most influential theologians of the last centuries such as Pope Benedict XVI, Karl Barth, Dietrich Bonhoeffer, Eduard Mörike, Miroslav Volv, Paul Tillich, David Strauss and Philip Melanchthon. The field of religious studies in Tübingen has also been the educational center for the philosophers Friedrich Wilhelm Joseph Schelling, Friedrich Hölderlin und Georg Wilhelm Friedrich Hegel. Tübingen is therefore sometimes considered as the home of German idealism, a philosophical movement which had a severe impact on modern western thinking.

Nobel laureates

Faculty members and alumni who have been awarded with the Nobel Prize:

William Ramsay (1904, Chemistry)
Eduard Buchner (1907, Chemistry), faculty
Karl Ferdinand Braun (1909, Physics), faculty
Fritz Pregl (1923, Chemistry)
Adolf Butenandt (1939, Chemistry), faculty
Hans Bethe (1967, Physics), faculty
Georg Wittig (1979, Chemistry), faculty
Hartmut Michel (1988, Chemistry)
Bert Sakmann (1991, Medicine)
Christiane Nüsslein-Volhard (1995, Medicine), faculty
Günter Blobel (1999, Medicine)

Quotes
"Tübingen does not have a university, Tübingen is a university." – Walter Jens
"One need merely say 'Tübingen Seminary' to understand what German philosophy is at bottom: an insidious theology. The Swabians are the best liars in Germany: they lie innocently." – Friedrich Nietzsche, 1888

See also 
 List of medieval universities
 List of universities in Germany
 Friedrich Althoff
 Robert-Bosch-Hospital
 Pi-Chacán
 Plato's unwritten doctrines, for the influential Tübingen School of Plato interpretation

References

Bibliography
Martin Biastoch, Tübinger Studenten im Kaiserreich. Eine sozialgeschichtliche Untersuchung: Contubernium – Tübinger Beiträge zur Universitäts- und Wissenschaftsgeschichte, Vol. 44 (Sigmaringen, 1996)
 Walter Jens, Eine deutsche Universität. 500 Jahre Tübinger Gelehrtenrepublik (Munich : Kindler, 1977)
 Tubingensia: Impulse zur Stadt- und Universitätsgeschichte. Festschrift für Wilfried Setzler zum 65. Geburtstag (Tübinger Bausteine zur Landesgeschichte, 10), edited by Sönke Lorenz and Volker [Karl] Schäfer (Ostfildern: Jan Thorbecke Verlag, 2008)

External links

University of Tubingen Official website
Erasmus and exchange to Tübingen

 
1470s establishments in the Holy Roman Empire
1477 establishments in Europe
Educational institutions established in the 15th century
Tourist attractions in Tübingen
Buildings and structures in Tübingen
Universities and colleges in Baden-Württemberg